National Highway 934 (NH 934) is a  National Highway in India.

National highways in India